Nada (English: Nothing) is a song by Colombian singer Juanes belonging to his debut album Fíjate Bien. The single went on sale in 2000. This song became known to Juanes as a great artist and one of the most successful singers of pop music.

Welcomed by the public

The song was well received in European and Latin American countries. The theme of the song is the life of an unfortunate person while in love. With this song the album Fíjate Bien had high sales in Hispanic countries, selling over one million copies worldwide, making it one of the best selling Spanish debut albums in the history of music.

Chart positions

The song arrived at number one in several countries in Latin America and Europe; it was in the top 40 Colombia, Mexico, and Spain, and quickly topped the charts. In Chile the song on its first day reached position 5 and the next week debuted at No. 1, this example was followed by several South American countries.

Music video

In the music video, Juanes is a convict awaiting his execution by electric chair. Various people pace around in the room with him, including a priest and a policeman, watching the clock impatiently while yelling in Juanes's ear. A woman and two children watch the execution from a window in a room above. When the clock strikes twelve, the executioner, who is shown as Juanes for a moment, throws the switch. A sign flashes "applause." After the execution is over, Juanes walks into the room with the woman and children.

Charts

References

2000 singles
Juanes songs
Songs written by Juanes
Song recordings produced by Gustavo Santaolalla
Spanish-language songs
Universal Music Latino singles
2000 songs